Sean O'Brien (born 13 October 2001) is an English professional footballer who plays for Forest Green Rovers, as an attacking midfielder and striker.

Career
O'Brien began his career with Millwall, moving on loan to Bromley in August 2021. After leaving Millwall he signed for Forest Green Rovers in September 2022. He joined Gloucester City on loan in November 2022.

Style of play
O'Brien has been described by the BBC as a "versatile forward" who can play "as a central striker or attacking midfielder".

References

2001 births
Living people
English footballers
Millwall F.C. players
Bromley F.C. players
Forest Green Rovers F.C. players
Gloucester City A.F.C. players
National League (English football) players
English Football League players
Association football midfielders
Association football forwards